The  Compañía Vinícola del Norte de España (CVNE) is a family winery  which was founded in 1879 in Haro, La Rioja, Spain. It belongs to the DOCa Rioja.

Since 1879, CVNE has at all times belonged to the direct descendants of the Real de Asua family. CVNE has always focused in vinegrowing and winemaking in Rioja. Its first exports started in 1880 to Europe and America. CVNE is quoted in the Spanish Stock Market.

History 

Among the more prominent milestones in the history of CVNE, wine pasteurization using a “Malvoisin” pasteurizer, a revolutionary device, placed CVNE at the pinnacle of innovation among world winemakers.

“El Carmen”, the largest all-concrete winemaking facility of its day in Spain, was set up in 1940 in a clear move towards the benefits of concrete winemaking. 

Later on, in 1989, “El Pilar”, a gravity-driven winemaking facility to handle CVNE’s grapes was first put to operational use. As old as winemaking, the gravity principle applied to winemaking gets rid of all hydraulic pumps and hoses, and is followed only by a handful of winemakers worldwide.

In 2005, CVNE refurbished the old winery buildings dating back to the 19th century, and created an educational area called “La Aldea del Vino” (The Wine Village), in which one of the very few remaining examples of Gustav Eiffel’s engineering techniques to avoid using pillars in wide buildings can be seen.

The latest in terms of vinegrowing and winemaking is, however, the implementation of a research project to reduce the yield per vine, as a means to improve the quality of wine, through increasing the population of vines per surface unit.

Wines 
The following wines are produced by CVNE:

 CUNE: The original name for this wine was supposed to have been CVNE, like the company, but an early misspelling decided this wine’s name for good. It was the first wine produced by CVNE in its winery in Haro.

 Imperial: This wine was first made in the 1920s and only made on vintages of exceptional quality. Depending on it, certain vintages undergo cask and bottle ageing to achieve ‘Reserva’ category, while others which are thought to be more suitable for an even longer maturation process are eventually released as ‘Gran Reserva’. All grapes are sourced from CVNE’s own vineyards at Villalba.

 Monopole: First produced in 1915, it is currently the oldest existing fresh white wine in Rioja, and possibly in the whole of Spain.

 Corona: Another rarity that goes back to the dawn of Rioja as a winemaking region, this semi sweet white is the only existing example in Rioja of a partial noble rot wine, in a country where Botrytis cinerea only occurs very seldom. This wine is typically made in minimal amounts, fermented in American oak barrels and obviously made only in those unusual years of high humidity conditions.

 Real de Asúa: A fairly recent addition to the CVNE range, the first vintage of which was 1994. Named after CVNE’s two founders, this wine is made from the same grapes as Imperial but the winemaking and cask ageing processes follow a completely different route, ending up in an entirely different wine.

 Viña Real: The Viña Real wines were first launched in 1920, made from grapes from the Rioja Alavesa area. Since then, these wine have typically been named as ‘Plata’ (Crianza), ‘Oro’ (Reserva), and Gran Reserva. A Viura-based Barrel Fermented white is also made.

 Pagos de Viña Real: The first vintage was 2001, at the same time as the start of the building work for Viña Real’s new winery. This wine is made from a selection of Tempranillo grapes hand-picked at Viña Real’s oldest vineyards in Rioja Alavesa. A further selection is carried out later on at the winery followed by winemaking in small wide oak vats and both malolactic fermentation and ageing in oak casks.

 Contino'': This wines are made exclusively from the stocks planted on its 62 hectares located in Laserna, near the town of Laguardia in the Rioja Alavesa wine making region.

Wineries

CVNE 

CVNE is the winery where the company began in 1879. And today it still sits on its original site, in the wine district, Barrio de la Estación, in Haro, Rioja Alta.

The Haro winery comprises a collection of structures and cellars, most dating from the 19th century, arranged around a central patio. Above the cellars are the winemaking, bottling, and shipping facilities, conserved to this day.

With the time, a serial number of structures have been built, which reflect the vinicole history of the winery. The Eiffel ‘s Cellar, designed by the architecture practice of the legendary Alexandre – Gustave Eiffel; The Real de Asúa cellar, a winery inside another winery. The Real de Asua cellar is an independent winery inside the original historic quarters of Cune. This cellar allows for a fully traditional winemaking process subject to the strictest quality controls.
The greater wines of the Compañía Vinícola del Norte de España, namely, Real de Asúa and Imperial, are made in this cellar.

Viña Real 

The Viña Real winery is located 10 minutes away from Logroño. It was designed by Philippe Mazieres.. His Majesty the King of Spain Juan Carlos I inaugurated the Viña Real winery in 2004, and was the first winery in Spain to be adapted for the physically handicapped and blind.

Viñedos del Contino 

Viñedos del Contino was set up jointly by CVNE and the Contino estate owners in 1973, establishing the first properly speaking “château” in Rioja. Contino is a 62 hectare estate along a meander on the northern bank of the river Ebro, near the village of Laserna (Rioja Alavesa). The estate is sheltered from the north and northeast by the Cerro de La Mesa hill, and from the south by the high cliffs of the southern river bank, making this property one of the sites in Rioja where to find some of the oldest vines of Graciano, one of Rioja’s very rare indigenous varieties, and a very distinctive feature of this estate’s wines. The winery itself is in the 14th century estate’s manor overlooking the entire property.

References

External links 
 Official CVNE's page

Wineries of Spain